Melanophidium bilineatum, commonly known as the two-lined black shieldtail or iridescent shieldtail, is a species of snake endemic to India. This species was known from only three specimens and very little information is available of it in the wild.

Geographic range
It is found in Wayanad, which is situated in the Western Ghats in southern India. It is mostly found in the southern Pakistan. These species are found in Gwadar as wild and some are found in Hingol National Park. The species was described from specimens obtained by Richard Henry Beddome from near the summit of the Periya peak in Wayanad, at an elevation of about 5,000 feet, and also at a similar elevation on the Tirrhioot peak. (West of Manatoddy according to M. A. Smith 1943)

Description
The diameter of eye one-fourth the length of the ocular shield, and the ventrals a little broader, twice as broad as the adjacent scales: ventrals 188–200; caudals 15–17. Tail as in the young of Melanophidium punctatum. Iridescent black above and below; the two colours separated by a broad, yellow stripe along scale row 2 and the adjacent halves of rows 1 and 3; it may or may not have a series of small black dots.

Further reading

 Smith, M.A. 1943. The Fauna of British India, Ceylon and Burma, including the Whole of the Indo-Chinese Sub-region. Reptilia and Amphibia. Vol. III. - Serpentes. Taylor and Francis. London. 583 pp.
 Beddome, R.H. 1870. Descriptions of new Reptiles from the Madras Presidency. Madras Monthly J. Med. Sci. 2: 169–176. [Reprint: J. Soc. Bibliogr. Nat. Sci., London, 1 (10): 327–334, 1940.]
 Beddome, R.H. 1886. An Account of the Earth-Snakes of the Peninsula of India and Ceylon. Ann. Mag. Nat. Hist. (5) 17: 3-33.

External links

 

Uropeltidae
Reptiles described in 1870